General Thomas Dresser White (August 6, 1901 – December 22, 1965) was the fourth Chief of Staff of the United States Air Force.

Life and military career

White was born in Walker, Minnesota, on August 6, 1901. His father was John Chanler White. Upon graduation from the United States Military Academy on July 2, 1920, he was commissioned a second lieutenant of Infantry and immediately promoted to first lieutenant.

Entering the Infantry School at Fort Benning, Georgia, White graduated in July 1921, and was assigned duty with the 14th Infantry Regiment at Fort Davis, Panama Canal Zone.

In September 1924, he entered Primary Flying School at Brooks Field, Texas. He graduated from Advanced Flying School at Kelly Field, Texas, in September 1925, and was assigned duty with the 99th Observation Squadron at Bolling Field, Washington, D.C.

In June 1927, White was assigned to duty as a student of the Chinese language in Peking, China. Four years later, he returned to the United States for duty at Headquarters Air Corps, Washington, D.C.

White was named assistant military attache for air to Russia in February 1934. A year later, he was appointed assistant military attache for air to Italy and Greece, with station at Rome.

White graduated from the Air Corps Tactical School at Maxwell Field, Alabama, in May 1938. He then entered Command and General Staff School at Fort Leavenworth, Kansas. He was named an outstanding alumni of the class 1939 and upon completion of this training was assigned to the Office of the Chief of Air Corps, Washington, D.C.

In April 1940, White became military attache to Brazil and the following August was named chief of the U.S. Military Air Mission to Brazil.

Returning to the United States in March 1942, White was appointed assistant chief of staff for operations of the Third Air Force at MacDill Field, Florida, and subsequently named chief of staff.

Reassigned to Army Air Forces Headquarters at The Pentagon, Virginia, in January 1944, he became assistant chief of air staff for intelligence.

Proceeding to the Southwest Pacific in September 1944, White assumed duty as the deputy commander of the Thirteenth Air Force, taking part in the campaigns of New Guinea, Southern Philippines and Borneo. The following June, he assumed command of the Seventh Air Force, which had based its headquarters in the Marianas and immediately moved with it to the recently taken Okinawa. In January 1946, he returned with the Seventh Air Force to Hawaii. That October, he was appointed chief of staff of the Pacific Air Command in Tokyo, Japan. One year later, in October 1947, White took command of the Fifth Air Force in Japan.

Transferred to the Office of the Secretary of the Air Force in October 1948, White became director of the Legislation and Liaison. He was appointed, in May 1950, Air Force Member of the Joint Strategic Survey Committee in the Office of the Joint Chiefs of Staff. He was assigned as director of Plans, Headquarters U.S. Air Force, in February 1951, and in July 1951, assumed duties of deputy chief of staff of operations for the Air Force.

White was promoted to the rank of general on June 30, 1953, and designated Vice Chief of Staff of the United States Air Force at that time, becoming Chief of Staff of the United States Air Force on July 1, 1957. He retired June 30, 1961.

Life after military 
Right after his retirement White was elected a director in Eastern Air Lines.

General White was the 1963 recipient of the General William E. Mitchell Memorial Award, which was awarded "the United States citizen making the outstanding individual contribution to aviation progress."

White was a fisherman, aquarist and amateur ichthyologist and while in Brazil he collected Zoological specimens with his wife, Constance, including the type of the Rio pearlfish Nematolebias whitei which was named in his honor.

He died at Walter Reed Army Medical Center on December 22, 1965, of leukemia, and is buried at Arlington National Cemetery.

He was posthumously inducted into the National Aviation Hall of Fame in 2011.

Awards and decorations

	
White received at least three more foreign decorations.

References

Thomas Dresser White Papers at Syracuse University

|-

1901 births
1965 deaths
Joint Chiefs of Staff
Chiefs of Staff of the United States Air Force
United States Military Academy alumni
Recipients of the Distinguished Service Medal (US Army)
Recipients of the Legion of Merit
United States Air Force generals
United States Army Command and General Staff College alumni
Air Corps Tactical School alumni
Recipients of the Air Medal
Burials at Arlington National Cemetery
Vice Chiefs of Staff of the United States Air Force
People from Walker, Minnesota
Military personnel from Minnesota